Critical Mass is the fourth studio album issued by the alternative metal band Ra. It was the group's first studio album publicly funded via Kickstarter. The album was made available for streaming via Loudwire on October 7, 2013.

This is the band's first album since its debut From One to feature drummer Skoota Warner.

Track listing

Personnel
Ra
Sahaj Ticotin – lead vocals, guitar, production
Ben Carroll – guitar, backing vocals
P.J. Farley – bass, backing vocals
Skoota Warner – drums

Additional
Travis Montgomery – guitar (track 10)
Paul Logus – mixing

References

2013 albums
Ra (American band) albums